Priya Prakash Varrier (born 28 October 1999) is an Indian actress who predominantly works in Malayalam films. Her wink in the film Oru Adaar Love went viral, making her the most searched-for personality through Google in India in 2018.

Early life and education
Priya was born on 28 October 1999 to Prakash Varrier, a Central Excise Department employee, and Preetha, a homemaker at Punkunnam, Thrissur, in Kerala. 

She attended school at Sandeepani Vidya Nikethan, Thrissur. In 2018, she enrolled in a Bachelor of Commerce course at Vimala College, Thrissur.

Career

She played the role of Priya in the 2019 film Oru Adaar Love, a romantic drama set in a school. The official teaser on YouTube, which includes Priya winking. Her wink was said to have gone viral.

In 2019, the song "Nee Mazhavillu Polen", which she sings with Naresh Iyer for the film Finals was released. She was cast in the Hindi film Sridevi Bungalow, which was in production as of January 2020.

She made her Telugu debut in Check (2021) in which she played a honey trapper opposite Nithin and Rakul Preet Singh.

Filmography

Discography

References

External links

 
Priya Prakash Varrier at Instagram

21st-century Indian actresses
1999 births
Indian film actresses
Living people
Malayali people
People from Thrissur district
Actresses from Kerala
Actresses in Malayalam cinema
Actresses in Telugu cinema
Actresses from Thrissur